Rosa Liliana Godoy (born 19 March 1982) is an Argentine runner. She placed 110th in the marathon at the 2016 Olympics. She also competed at the 2007 Pan American Games for the women's 3000 meters steeplechase.

References

External links

 

1982 births
Living people
Argentine female long-distance runners
Argentine female marathon runners
Place of birth missing (living people)
Athletes (track and field) at the 2016 Summer Olympics
Olympic athletes of Argentina
Athletes (track and field) at the 2007 Pan American Games
Pan American Games competitors for Argentina
21st-century Argentine women